Ziano di Fiemme is a comune (municipality) in Trentino in the northern Italian region Trentino-Alto Adige/Südtirol, located about  northeast of Trento.

References

Cities and towns in Trentino-Alto Adige/Südtirol